Adolphus is an unincorporated community in southern Allen County, Kentucky, United States. The community is due south of Scottsville. The community is primarily a rural area on farmland.

History
A post office called Adolphus has been in operation since 1888. The community has the name of Adolphus Alexander, a railroad attorney.

Climate
The climate in this area is characterized by hot, humid summers and generally mild to cool winters.  According to the Köppen Climate Classification system, Adolphus has a humid subtropical climate, abbreviated "Cfa" on climate maps.

References

Unincorporated communities in Allen County, Kentucky
Unincorporated communities in Kentucky